Toni Rothmund (2 October 1877, in Barlt, Schleswig-Holstein – 22 August 1956) was a German writer and journalist. 

She wrote biographies, novels and tales.

Work

Biographies 

 Mesmer - Genie oder Scharlatan?

Tales 

 Die Bernsteinperle 
In English, The Amber Bead. This story was translated to English by Winifred Katzin, illustrated by Ernst Kutzer, and published (hardcover) in New York by Longmans, Green and Co. in 1930. 
Precis: Heide, a small child, is a foundling being raised by an old herbalist woman high on a mountainside. Heide can speak with all animals. Her conversations with the denizens of the mountain illustrate Man's inhumanity to man and the essential animality of Homo sapiens. Heide owns an amber bead, the history of which is slowly revealed. Through the bead, Heide is ultimately reunited her with her mother. 

 Vom Allermärchenbaum

Poetry 

 Einsamkeiten
 Der Baum, der vor Winter noch einmal blühte

External links
A list of publications by Rothmund (German)

1877 births
1956 deaths
German women poets
Women biographers
German women novelists
German women journalists
People from Dithmarschen